Dar Sufian (also Romanized as Dar Şūfīān, Dār Şūfeyān, and Dar Sūfīyān) is a village in Aladagh Rural District, in the Central District of Bojnord County, North Khorasan Province, Iran. At the 2006 census, its population was 338, in 68 families. It is about 565 km (351 mi) away from Tehran, the country's capital.

References 

Populated places in Bojnord County